The 21 Conspiracy is a low budget Australian  web series following a group attempting to uncover a worldwide conspiracy one only learns at 21. It was nominated in the class "Individual episode" for the 2009 Webby Awards, and featured by Wes Craven in his Halloween 2008 picks.

References

External links 
 Show website

2008 web series debuts
Australian drama web series